Zambar may refer to:

Geography
Zambar (river), a river of Tajikistan
Zambar, Afghanistan, a settlement in Sabari District, Khost Province, Afghanistan
Zambar, Iran, a settlement in Markazi Province, Iran
Zambar, Iraq, a settlement in Neineva Province, Iraq
Zambar, Uzbekistan, a settlement in Sirdaryo Region, Uzbekistan
Zambara, a settlement in Central Region, Malawi
Jabal Zambar, a mountain of Iraq
Zambar Toy, river of Khost Province, Afghanistan

Other uses
Zambar (restaurant), an Indian restaurant in Gurgaon
Zambar (tiger), an Amur Tiger at Blackpool Zoo
Moshe Zambar, former governor of the Bank of Israel